Picart is a French surname. Notable people with the surname include:

Bernard Picart (1673–1733), French engraver
Caroline Joan S. Picart, American academic 
Jean-Michel Picart (c. 1600–1682), Flemish still life painter and art dealer

Surnames of French origin
French-language surnames